Aloe vaombe is a species of aloe endemic to southern Madagascar. It is a succulent, evergreen plant with an unbranched stem up to 5 meters in height, and 20 cm in diameter.

References
 Rech. Fl. Mérid. Madagascar 96 1912.
 The Plant List
 JSTOR
 Encyclopedia of Life
 Useful Tropical Plants

vaombe